Johannes Jaanis (also Johannes Janis; 15 September 1888, in Kalvi (now in Viru-Nigula Parish), Wierland County – 12 February 1959, in Paris, France) was an Estonian politician. He was a member of II Riigikogu.

References

1888 births
1959 deaths
People from Viru-Nigula Parish
People from Kreis Wierland
Estonian People's Party politicians
National Centre Party (Estonia) politicians
Members of the Riigikogu, 1923–1926
Members of the Riigikogu, 1929–1932
Members of the Riigikogu, 1932–1934
Estonian World War II refugees
Estonian emigrants to France